The yerbomatófono, also known as yerbomatófono d'amore, is an informal musical instrument, presumably originating among the aboriginal cultures of the Rio de la Plata, recreated in the 1960s by the Buenos Aires luthier Carlos Iraldi (28 January 1930-16 December 1995) for the informal humorist association Les Luthiers.  It's actually a Kazoo made up of maté gourds cut in half; upon blowing and singing across the aperture the sound was amplified and distorted in a peculiar manner.  The instrument has, since its re-creation, been used primarily in Argentina and Uruguay.

References

Aerophones
Yerba mate
Uruguayan musical instruments
Argentine musical instruments
Reconstructed musical instruments